Cardamine californica, or milkmaids, is a flowering plant in the family Brassicaceae, native to western North America from Washington to California and Baja California. It is common in a variety of habitats including shady slopes, open woodlands, chaparral and grasslands in the winter and early spring. In the San Francisco Bay Area, it is one of the first wildflowers to bloom, with blossoms from January to May.

Description
Cardamine californica is an herbaceous perennial plant growing to about 1 foot tall. The flowers are borne on a raceme inflorescence, each flower about 1/2 inch in diameter with four white to pink petals. The flower closes its petals in late afternoon as the sun goes down and nods its pedicel before a rain, protecting the pollen.

Hand pollination of two milkmaids populations in the San Francisco Presidio improved seed set from 8% to 85%, with seeds ripening in about 53 days.

References

Sources
"Wildflowers of Henry W. Coe State Park" brochure, Larry Ulrich, 2002

External links
Photo of Milkmaids in Henry Coe State Park
Jepson Manual Treatment - Cardamine californica
USDA Plants Profile; Cardamine californica
Cardamine californica - Photo gallery

californica
Flora of California
Flora of the Sierra Nevada (United States)
Flora of the West Coast of the United States
Flora of Baja California
Flora without expected TNC conservation status